Labdia niphosticta is a moth in the family Cosmopterigidae. It was described by Edward Meyrick in 1936. It is found in Japan.

References

Labdia
Moths described in 1936